Wedu (also known as Wedu Global) is a social enterprise based in Bangkok, Thailand. The organisation's mission is to provide "high potential young women" ("Rising Stars") from Asian communities with access to long-term mentorship and financing options to complete higher education and develop leadership skills.

Wedu works with NGOs, educational institutions, and individuals based in communities across Asia ("Talent Spotters") to identify young women demonstrating "strong leadership potential" with a focus on those from underserved communities. Wedu's Talent Spotters include the Asian University for Women, Women LEAD, Khmer Youth Association, Thabyay Education Foundation, and Hands in Outreach.  Wedu also works with Kiva and is currently a member of the Clinton Global Initiative (part of the Clinton Foundation).

History
Mario Ferro and Mari Sawai, 2009 graduates of the London School of Economics Masters in Development Program, founded Wedu (an acronym for women's education) in 2012 as their response to the lack of female leaders in Asia. They began by identifying potential community leaders in Cambodia with support of the Khmer Youth Association. The organisation has since grown from 5 Rising Stars in its first cohort to 140 as of September 2015. Wedu plans to serve 1,000 Rising Stars by 2018.

Business Model
Wedu seeks to identify young women with strong leadership potential in underserved communities. Once selected, the organisation assigns the "Rising Stars" with a mentor who serves as a guide in the development of their leadership skills.

Mentors come from various sectors and levels of work experience. According to Wedu, mentors supplement their leadership skills through the Learning Objectives in the Mentorship Program.
Wedu provides scholarships to Rising Stars who are pursuing or applying for a university education in Asia. All applicants are required to take part in the Wedu Mentorship Program for a minimum of 6 months before they are eligible to apply for financial support. Wedu utilizes Future Income Sharing Agreements (FISAs): financial instruments more flexible and affordable than university loans, as reported by the organisation. Rising Stars who are granted FISAs can contribute a small percentage of their future income for a fixed amount of time, leveraging income-based contributions to finance the education of future Rising Stars. According to Wedu, this contributes to a sustainable force for the advancement of women across Asia.

Achievements
 1st Prize D2D Business Plan Competition 2012.
 1st Prize University of Cambridge CUE 1K Competition 2012.
 Social Enterprise Start-up of the year 2012 at Cambridge University.
 1st Prize Global Social Venture Competition 2013, South East Asia round and finalist in the global round.
 3rd Prize Global Solution Award 2013, by Women Deliver.

Legal and funding
Wedu was incorporated in London in May 2012 and is a registered charity in the United Kingdom and a foundation in Thailand.

References

External links
 http://www.weduglobal.org/

Social enterprises
Charities based in Thailand